Natasha Pointer (born June 27, 1979) is an American basketball coach and former player who is currently the head women's basketball coach at the University of Illinois at Chicago. She was drafted in the fourth round of the 2001 WNBA draft by the Portland Fire with the 52nd overall pick.

Playing career 
Pointer played college basketball at Rutgers, where she was a four-year starter as a point guard. At Rutgers, she was the first person in the history of the Big East Conference to record more than 1,000 points, 700 assists, 500 rebounds, and 250 steals as well as the first player to record a triple-double in the history of Rutgers women's basketball.

Pointer was drafted by the Portland Fire with the 52nd overall pick in the 2001 WNBA draft, but did not make the final roster. She was later selected by the Chicago Blaze in the third round of the National Women's Basketball League draft in 2004 and played two games with them. Pointer was later signed by the New York Liberty but was waived a month later.

Rutgers statistics

Source

Coaching career 
Pointer began her coaching career at Columbia as an assistant coach in 2004. She was also an assistant at Xavier for one season before joining her alma mater Rutgers as an assistant coach. She spent eight seasons with the Scarlet Knights helping them rebuild themselves into contenders before joining St. John's in 2015 as an assistant coach. Pointer left St. John's after two seasons to join Northwestern as an assistant coach.

Pointer was named the head coach at UIC in 2018. It was announced that Pointer would not return after the 2021–22 season.

Head coaching record

References

External links 
 
 UIC Flames profile
 Rutgers Scarlet Knights profile

1979 births
Living people
Basketball players from Chicago
Basketball coaches from Illinois
Columbia Lions women's basketball coaches
Northwestern Wildcats women's basketball coaches
Rutgers Scarlet Knights women's basketball coaches
Rutgers Scarlet Knights women's basketball players
Sportspeople from Chicago
St. John's Red Storm women's basketball coaches
UIC Flames women's basketball coaches
Xavier Musketeers women's basketball coaches